Strophanthus nicholsonii grows as a deciduous scrambling shrub. The plant is native to Malawi, Mozambique, Zambia and Zimbabwe.

References

nicholsonii
Plants described in 1897
Flora of South Tropical Africa